Cutaway may refer to:

Technology
 Cutaway (guitar), a feature of some guitar body shapes
 Cutaway (industrial), the display of a manufactured product, where a portion of the exterior housing has been removed to reveal the internal components
 Cutaway drawing, a type of drawing based on the design technique to cut away part of the outside to show some of the inner work
 Cutaway van chassis, an incomplete vehicle for further assembly by a manufacturer of conversion vans, RVs, ambulances, etc.
 Cut-away, disconnecting a parachute that has malfunctioned

Film
 Cutaway (2000 film), with Tom Berenger, Maxine Bahns, Stephen Baldwin and others
 Cutaway (2014 film), directed by Kazik Radwanski
 Cutaway (filmmaking), a film-making technique

Other uses
 Cutaway, a flying trapeze trick
 Morning coat, also called a cutaway, a type of formal coat